The 1974 Furman Paladins football team represented the Furman University as a member of the Southern Conference (SoCon) during the 1974 NCAA Division I football season. Led by Art Baker in his second year as head coach, William & Mary Furman  the season 5–6 overall and 2–4 in SoCon play to place seventh.

Schedule

Roster

References

External links
  

Furman
Furman Paladins football seasons
Furman Paladins football